This is the list of the railway stations in Friuli-Venezia Giulia owned by:
 Rete Ferroviaria Italiana (RFI), a branch of the Italian state company Ferrovie dello Stato;
 Ferrovie Udine-Cividale (FUC).

RFI stations

FUC stations

See also

Railway stations in Italy
Ferrovie dello Stato
Rail transport in Italy
High-speed rail in Italy
Transport in Italy

References

External links

 
Friuli-Venezia Giulia